Buddy is a Norwegian electric city car, produced by Buddy Electric in the early 2000s, formerly known as Pure Mobility and Elbil Norge AS, at Økern in Oslo. In 2007, the Buddy, and its predecessor, the Kewet, made up 20% of the electric cars in Norway. Since its inception in 1991, combined sales of the Kewet and Buddy had totaled about 1,500 vehicles through October 2013, of which, 1,087 were registered in Norway.

History

Buddy is the sixth generation of the Kewet electric vehicle. Originally, the Kewet was developed in Hadsund, Denmark, and the first model was made in 1991. Production alternated between Hadsund, Denmark and Nordhausen, Germany. During the first five generations, over 1000 electric vehicles were produced. They were sold in 18 countries. In 1998, all rights were acquired by ElBil Norge AS (which, at the time, was called Kollega Bil AS). For some years, ElBil Norge further developed the vehicle and in the autumn of 2005, a new model was presented that was first called Kewet Buddy Citi-Jet 6, but is now known simply as the Buddy.

In December 2008, the first 12 Buddy cars were sent from the Buddy factory in Økern by boat to Copenhagen. In 2010, Pure Mobility (former "Elbil Norge") launched a new version of the Buddy, initially marketed as "MetroBuddy", but the "Metro" prefix was removed due to negative or confusing associations with the term.

Technology and production

Buddy is a simple, functional, electric city car with a range of  depending on the season, topography and driving style.

The Buddy consists of a strong, hot galvanized steel tube frame with safety cage, but with no proper deformation zones. The body is made of thin fiberglass. Other metal parts are treated so that further rust treatment is unnecessary. The electric motor is a 72V Sepex 13 kW, a direct current motor with brushes. Well-tried technological solutions have been used for maximal reliability. The car has no servo or aids regarding steering and braking, and the response and "connection" to brakes and front wheels are vague and difficult to finesse. It also lacks safety equipment such as ABS, ESP or airbags.

Charging uses an ordinary grounded outlet with a minimum circuit of 10 A. The batteries' life expectancy is 2–5 years, or about 20 000 km, depending on driving and charging habits.

ElBil Norge has made a development fleet of Buddy vehicles equipped with various forms of Li-ion battery technology. When the technology becomes available commercially, existing vehicles will potentially be upgradeable.

The Buddy was EU approved as a heavy quadricycle (an electric four-wheel motorcycle) by the Vehicle Certification Agency. It can be used as an ordinary vehicle without restrictions, and drivers require only an ordinary driver's license.

Two models of the Buddy were available: the standard version, and the BuddyCab with a folding roof. In 2007, production at Økern in Oslo was 5–6 vehicles a week, with a theoretical capacity of 500 vehicles annually. To meet international needs, ElBil Norge was working to establish new production facilities. The Buddy has been sold only in Norway while the company prepares for export.

As of late 2008, plans were under way for an additional factory in Portugal, with projected production of 5000 cars per year.

Sales

 
The Buddy ranked 29th in sales by automotive brands in Norway in 2006, ahead of Jaguar, Fiat, Smart and Porsche. While most other cars there are dark or muted colors, about 80% of Buddys are delivered in a multitude of strong, bright colours, with many using bold decorative elements such as flowers, hearts, clouds, and flames. One cloud-covered Buddy was designed to match the owner's night table lamp.

125 Buddies were sold in Norway in 2011, a market share of 6% of all electric vehicles sold in the country that year. , 1,087 units were registered in Norway, the leading market, consisting of 2 Kewet CITI VANs, 22 Kewet EL-JET (1–4)s, 50 Kewet CITI JET 5s, 379 Buddy M9 (2010–2013), and 634 Kewet Buddy Citi-Jet 6 (2005–2009).

Operations and ownership

Buddy was produced by Buddy Electric (formerly known as "Pure Mobility" and "ElBil Norge AS") which in 2003 changed its name from Kollega Bil AS. Originally established in 1992, it has been in the electric vehicle business since that time. Its managing director is Kjell Strøm. Elbil Norge AS is owned by its original founders Jan-Petter Skram and Viggo Vargum, and external investors include Hafslund Venture AS, Gezina AS (Th. Brøvig), members of the Selvaag family, Lychegaarden (Jens P. Heyerdahl) and Jan Chr G Sundt. The owners have gradually expanded the company. In 2005, the owners invested NOK 12 million to expand the Økern factory. ElBil Norge was profitable in 2004 and 2005 and has a ratio of owner equity to debt of 90%.

Technical specifications

Mass without batteries:  
Lead batteries weight: 
Maximum allowed weight: 
Seating capacity: 3 adults
Length x Width x Height: 2440 x 1430 x 1440 mm
Wheelbase: 155 cm
Turning circle: 7.0 m
Motor: SepEx 72V DC
Power: 13 kW
Top speed:  
Acceleration: 0–50 km/h in 7 s
Maximum hill-starting ability: 20% 
Suspension: Front – MacPherson struts.   Rear – Independent telescopic suspension
Wheels/Tyres standard: Alloy wheels 4Jx13 //  135(145)/80R13
Brakes: Regenerative braking to enhance the driving range.
Disc brakes on all wheels with double circuit braking system. Parking brake on the rear wheels 
Body: Fibreglass reinforced polyester
Safety cabin: Welded tubular steel space frame, optional hot dip galvanised
Batteries: 
Maintenance-free lead acid batteries, ca 10,5 kWh available. 
Under testing systems with lithium-ion battery technology, 10 or 14 kWh
Charging time: 0–100% in 6–8 hours, 30–95% in 3 hours
Range: 
Lead-acid batteries , depending on road conditions, temperature and the driver
Lithium-ion batteries up to 
Homologation number (Reference Approval Number): e11*2002/24*0153*03 (2002/24/EG: Type Approval for 2- and 3-wheeled motorised vehicles)

In popular culture
The Buddy appeared in the Hollywood film Downsizing (2017) starring Matt Damon. It is also driven by the main character in the Norwegian drama film 1001 Grams (2014).

See also

Electric car use by country
Plug-in electric vehicles in Norway
Government incentives for plug-in electric vehicles
List of modern production plug-in electric vehicles
Plug-in electric vehicle
Uniti (car)

References

External links
 Official company website
Electric car calculator (in Norwegian)
Buddy user manual (.pdf) (in Norwegian)

Production electric cars
Electric city cars
Microcars
Automotive industry in Norway
Car manufacturers of Norway
Norwegian brands
Hadsund